A myotome is the group of muscles that a single spinal nerve innervates. Similarly a dermatome is an area of skin that a single nerve innervates with sensory fibers. Myotomes are separated by myosepta (singular: myoseptum). In vertebrate embryonic development, a myotome is the part of a somite that develops into muscle.

Structure
The anatomical term myotome  which describes the muscles served by a spinal nerve root, is also used in embryology to describe that part of the somite which develops into the muscles.   In anatomy the myotome is the motor equivalent of a dermatome.

Function
Each muscle in the body is supplied by one or more levels or segments of the spinal cord and by their corresponding spinal nerves.  A group of muscles innervated by the motor fibres of a single nerve root is known as a myotome.

List of myotomes
Myotome distributions of the upper and lower extremity are as follows;
 C1/C2: neck flexion/extension
 C3: Lateral Neck Flexion
 C4: shoulder elevation
 C5: Shoulder abduction
 C6: Elbow flexion/Wrist Extension
 C7: Elbow extension/Wrist flexion
 C8: Thumb extension
 T1: Finger Abduction & Adduction
 L1/L2: Hip Flexion
 L3: Knee extension
 L4: Ankle dorsi-flexion
 L5: Great toe extension
 S1: Hip extension/Ankle plantar-flexion/ankle eversion
 S2: Knee flexion
 S3–S4: anal wink

Clinical significance
In humans myotome testing can be an integral part of neurological examination as each nerve root coming from the spinal cord supplies a specific group of muscles. Testing of myotomes, in the form of isometric resisted muscle testing, provides the clinician with information about the level in the spine where a lesion may be present. During myotome testing, the clinician is looking for muscle  weakness of a particular group of muscles. Results may indicate lesion to the spinal cord nerve root, or intervertebral disc herniation pressing on the spinal nerve roots.

See also
 Dermatome (anatomy)
 Somite

References

Further reading
Neurology Textbook, edited by Professor L. Sokolva, M.D., D.Sc. 2012,

External links
 
 
 

Neurology